Nanka Railway (Nankai Tetsudō kabushiki gaisha) was a private railway company in Karafuto Prefecture during the days of the Empire of Japan. Founded in April 1925 as a subsidiary of Ōji Paper, the company operated the Nanka Line that ran  from Shinba Station on the East Coast Line to Rūtaka Station in what was then the town of Rūtaka. The company also operated a network of buses connecting Rūtaka and, via Rūtaka, Honto with the prefectural capital of Toyohara and also with Ōdomari, now Korsakov, where passengers could connect with the Chihaku ferry to Wakkanai.

Nanka Line
As published by the Ministry of Railways, as of 1 October 1937 the stations served by the Nanka Railway were as follows:

See also

 Hōshin Line
 Kawakami Line

References

Karafuto
History of rail transport in Japan
Defunct railway companies of Japan
1925 establishments in Japan
Railway companies established in 1925